72 Hours: Martyr Who Never Died is a 2019 Indian biographical drama film directed by Avinash Dhyani. The story is based on the life and times of rifleman Jaswant Singh Rawat, who fought against the encroaching Chinese army during the 1962 Sino-Indian War. The film got positive reviews from both audience and critics.

Plot
Following the biography of Jaswant Singh Rawat, this movie is set in the 1960s, when apart from economic instability, famine, and communal tension, India was ill-prepared with the 1962 Sino-Indian War. Jaswant was born in an impecunious Garhwali Rajput family in Garhwal, Dehradun, Uttarakhand. He grew up to be a responsible son, devoting his life towards study and family, but due to several incidents, he decided to join the army as a young man and received his training at Garhwal in Pauri Garhwal District and enlisted under the Garhwal Rifles Regiment. Shortly after his training, their paltan (platoon) is sent to defend from the encroaching Chinese army from the northeastern front. Due to adverse circumstances and setbacks, the infantry has to step back. However, Rifleman Jaswant Singh Rawat refuses to leave and fights against the Chinese army alone for 72 hours.

Cast 

Avinash Dhyani as Rifleman Jaswant Singh Rawat
Mukesh Tiwari as Hawaldar CM Singh Gusain
Virendra Saxena as Shri. Guman Rawat
Alka Amin as Leela Rawat
Shishir Sharma as Col. S. N. Tandon
Gireesh Sahdev as Company Commander Sher Singh
Prashil Rawat as Rifleman Jeet Singh
Abhishek Maindola as Nayak Laali Chaman
Ishtiaaq Khan as Rifleman Darbaan Singh
Sumit Gulati as Rifleman Trilok Singh Negi
Yeshi Dema as Noora
Naman Tiwari as Young Jaswant Singh Rawat
Suraj Dholakhandi as Rifleman Leela Singh Rawat
 Unknown as  Ram Gopal Singh

Previews
The first-look poster of the movie was released on 26 November 2018. An official teaser was published on 17 December 2018. The official trailer was released on 24 December 2018.

Soundtrack 

The film's soundtrack was composed by Sunjoy Bose and lyrics were penned by Vikas Chauhan, Seema Saini, Ashish Chaterjee, Sujata Devrani and Nishant Mishra.

References

External links 

2019 films
Indian biographical films
2010s Hindi-language films
Films set in 1962
Sino-Indian War films